Kuo-En Chang (born 1958) was the president of Tunghai University and former president of National Taiwan Normal University.

Born in 1958, Chang grew up in a fishing village of Keelung, Taiwan. After junior high school, he gave up "the chance to study at the Affiliated Senior High School of National Taiwan Normal University (國立臺灣師範大學附屬高級中學|師大附中) and chose to join the Department of Electrical Engineering at National Taiwan Institute of Technology (now the National Taiwan University of Science and Technology, 國立臺灣科技大學) for professional training." After the national compulsory military service, Chang spent a year on professional practice. He not only worked on lathes but also utility poles. Afterwards, Chang resumed his studies in the Department of Electronic Engineering.

Chang then switched to the fields of computation in the Department of Electrical Engineering at National Taiwan University (國立臺灣大學), where he received a M.S.C. in 1986 and a Ph.D. in 1990. After graduation, Chang joined the NTNU, where he integrated computation with education and launched virtual learning, digital learning, and mobile learning. His endeavor in Elearning has also won him a patent in "The Software Structure for Interactive Learning on the Internet" (網際網路互動式教學軟體架構) in Taiwan.

At NTNU, Chang had been the director of Computer Center (Aug. 1990-July 1993), the director of the NTNU Library (Aug. 2004-July 2007), and the vice president (Aug. 2007-Feb. 2010). His excellence in academic research has won him numerous awards from 
the National Science Council (now the Ministry of Science and Technology) and the Ministry of Education. He has been the principal of NTNU since 22 February 2010.

Education

Ph.D., Electrical Engineering, National Taiwan University (1986 -1990)
M.S.C., Electrical Engineering, National Taiwan University (1984 -1986)
B.S.C., Electronic Engineering, National Taiwan University of Science and Technology (1982 -1984)

Positions

Professor, Grad. Institute of Information and Computer Education, NTNU (Aug. 1997–Present)
President of NTNU (Feb. 2010 – Feb. 2018)
Vice President of NTNU (Aug. 2007 - Feb. 2010)
Director of the NTNU Library (Aug. 2004 - July 2007)
Founder and Consultant, eLearning Quality Service Center (2005)
Consultant of Digital Learning at The Industrial Technology Research Institute (ITRI) (2004)
Assessment Committee, Program for Science and Technology for Learning in the Promotion of University Academic Excellence, National Central University (2003, 2004, 2005)
Convener of the first subproject, National Science & Technology Program for ELearning (2003 - 2008)
Development Committee of Information Education for Elementary and Junior High Students, Taichung City Government (Mar.2002 - Feb. 2005)
Consultant, Computer Softwarebased Skill Test and Certification, Bureau of Employment and Vocational Training (Jan. 2002 - Dec. 2004)
Director of Grad. Institute of Information and Computer Education, NTNU (Aug. 2000 - July 2002)
Visiting Scholar at Bond University in Australia (Aug. 2000 - Jan. 2001)
Preparatory Committee of Department of Information Education at National Taitung University (Aug. 1999 - July 2000)
Director of Computer Center, NTNU (Aug. 1990 - July 1993)
Associate Professor, Dept. of Information and Computer Education, NTNU (Feb. 1990 - July 1997)
Lecturer, Dept. of Information and Computer Education, NTNU (Aug. 1987 - Jan. 1990)
Lecturer, Dept. of Electronic Engineering, HsinPu Private Junior College of Industry (St. John’s University) (Aug. 1986 - July 1987)
Reviewing Committee, Department of Science Education at National Science Council (1999–Present)

References

Living people
Academic staff of the National Taiwan Normal University
Year of birth missing (living people)